People's Solidarity for Participatory Democracy (PSPD, 참여연대) is a South Korean non-governmental organization that was established on 10 September 1994 with around 200 members . 

In 2004, PSPD obtained a special consultative status with the UN ECOSOC and started advocating before various UN bodies including the UN human rights council. 

As of July 2012, around 13,000 individuals are members of PSPD. It has ten departments and three auxiliaries.

References

External links 
 The official website, People’s Solidarity for Participatory Democracy 

Non-profit organizations based in South Korea
Participatory democracy